The Indonesian Presidential Aircraft, also known as Indonesia One with a serial number A-001 is the presidential aircraft carrying the president and vice president of Indonesia. The aircraft was designed to meet the minimum safety and security standards to support the VVIP air transportation needs of the Indonesian president, and includes a modest self-defense system.

The construction and modification of the Boeing 737-800 aircraft started in 2011. It is based on the Boeing Business Jet 2 variant. The aircraft was completed in 2014 and arrived at Halim Perdanakusuma Airbase in Jakarta on 10 April 2014. The call sign of this aircraft is "Indonesia One" with serial number "A-001". The aircraft belongs to the State Secretariat of the Republic of Indonesia, and is operated by the Indonesian Air Force (TNI-AU), and maintained by Garuda Maintenance Facility. Beginning in 2020, the Indonesian Government chartered a Boeing 777-300ER aircraft, registration PK-GIG, from Garuda for the president's use on long-haul flights.

History 

In the 1960s, Indonesia's first presidential aircraft was an Ilyushin Il-14, acquired from the Soviet government, and was used by Indonesia's first President, Sukarno. This aircraft was named "Dolok Martimbang", and was allocated to 17 Squadron of the Indonesian Air Force. This aircraft, however, was not modified specifically for its role as a presidential aircraft.

Shortly after Sukarno visited the United States in 1961, the IL-14 was replaced by three Lockheed C-140 Jetstar aircraft, as a gift from John F. Kennedy. These aircraft were named "Pancasila", "Sapta Marga" and "Irian".

In the New Order era, the Indonesian Presidential Aircraft was originally planned to be a Boeing 727-200 but this was later cancelled and a Boeing 707-320C, originally intended to be used by Pelita Air, was used instead. This aircraft used the civilian registration PK-PJQ from 1975 to 1986 until it was transferred to the Indonesian Air Force as A-7002, and retired from service around 2003. This Boeing 707 was also leased to Sempati Air for chartered flights to Japan and to Garuda Indonesia for hajj flights in the 1980s. However, Suharto frequently used a Garuda Indonesia DC-10 for overseas state visits and a Pelita Air Avro RJ85 for local state visits.

The president of Indonesia and the vice president formerly used aircraft chartered from Garuda Indonesia for air travel. Boeing 737-800s were used for domestic flights and short-range international flights while Airbus A330-300s were used for most overseas trips and state visits. The Indonesian Air Force also has special VIP squadrons for the president, vice president and government ministers. One of them is the 17 Squadron operating Avro RJ85s, Boeing 737-200s, Boeing 737-400s, Fokker F27-400s, Fokker F28-1000s and the Lockheed C-130 Hercules fixed-wing aircraft; while the other squadron is the 45 Squadron flying Aérospatiale AS 332L-1 Super Puma helicopters. All these aircraft and helicopters are based at Halim Perdanakusuma Airforce Base, Jakarta. Almost all presidential flights depart from there. Garuda Indonesia and Indonesian Air Force aircraft were used by Indonesian presidents Sukarno, Suharto, B.J. Habibie, Abdurrahman Wahid, Megawati Sukarnoputri and during most of Susilo Bambang Yudhoyono's administration.

The plan to acquire a new presidential aircraft had been contemplated since the Abdurrahman Wahid administration (1999 – 2001). On 3 November 2009, the legislature approved a budget of IDR 200 billion as down payment for a VVIP Boeing 737-500 aircraft. The Indonesian State Secretariat included the cost of buying a new airplane into the 2010-2011 state budget.

In January 2010, the Indonesian Government announced a USD 200 million budget to acquire a new aircraft for presidential and government use. The government insisted the cost of operating its own aircraft would be lower than chartering a Garuda aircraft every time the President had to travel. On 27 December 2010, Indonesian Government with Boeing signed a purchase agreement for a 737-800 Boeing Business Jet 2 aircraft.

On 20 January 2012, Indonesian Government received a "green " (plain "hollow" aircraft prior to any specific modifications) BBJ2 variant of the 737-800  from the Boeing company, to be further modified and equipped with interior and security features. The price of plain aircraft prior to modification is USD 58 million. After several delays the BBJ2 was delivered on 10 April 2014 and received by the Indonesia Ministry of State Secretary Sudi Silalahi.

President Susilo Bambang Yudhoyono was the first president who flew in "Indonesia One" on state duties, on 5 May 2014 when he flew from Jakarta to Denpasar, Bali, to attend the regional conference of Open Government Partnership (OGP) Asia-Pacific.

President Joko Widodo's first trip in "Indonesia One" was shortly after his inauguration on 29 October 2014. President Joko Widodo flew to Medan, North Sumatra, and went to Karo Regency to address the natural disaster relief efforts and to visit the refugees of the 2014 Mount Sinabung eruption. On this occasion, the president was accompanied by first lady Iriana, Ministry of Social affairs Khofifah Indar Parawansa, and his daughter Kahiyang Ayu.

Specification and description
The aircraft was purchased for US$ 91.2 million or around Rp 820 billion, comprising US$58.6 million for the aircraft, US$27 million for the cabin interior, US$4.5 million for the security system, and US$1.1 million for administration. The aircraft can carry up to 67 passengers, can fly up to 10 hours non-stop, and is able to land on short airstrips.

The interior of the airplane consists of several rooms. It has four VVIP meeting rooms, a master VVIP en suite bedroom, two VVIP state rooms, 12 executive seats and 44 staff seats.

The aircraft has two CFM56-7 engines, a service ceiling of 41,000 feet, a cruising speed of 0.785 Mach and a maximum speed of 0.85 Mach. It can also reach a maximum cruising range of 4,620 nautical miles or 8,556 kilometers. It is 38 meters long, 35.79 meter wingspan, 12.5 meters tall and has a ceiling of 41,000 feet, a range up to 10,000 km and fuel capacity of 35,539 liters contained in 6 tanks.

Defense system
The security features include an embedded anti missile system. The aircraft has a heat detector and also radar to detect foreign objects, missiles or other airplanes, near, around or approaching the aircraft, plus the ability to avoid the attack. The US$4.5-million anti-missile defense system deploys chaff, a cloud of thin metal sheets and plastic pieces, and flares — as a countermeasure to deter guided missile strikes. Despite its VVIP security features, the aircraft is not fitted with weapons and was not designed for combat. Four Air Force pilots were trained by Boeing to operate the defense system on board.

Livery

The Indonesian presidential aircraft is painted red on top and white on the bottom, the colors of the national flag. The two color fields is separated by a golden strip, the Indonesian national colors, creating a long curved golden ribbon along the fuselage. On top and along the windows there are the Indonesian National Emblem Garuda Pancasila followed by the text "REPUBLIK INDONESIA" in white, on each sides. On the front directly below the cockpit windows there is the Indonesian presidential emblems of a gold star on each side. On vertical stabilizer there is a print of Indonesian flag on each sides.
 
After the aircraft was unveiled, its livery and color scheme was sky blue on top and white on the bottom, and attracted criticism. Some deemed it "unattractive", while others noted the similarity of sky blue color scheme to the United States Air Force One, and others suspected a political connotation. Minister of State Secretary Sudi Silalahi, responded that the sky blue color was chosen for safety and security reasons, as a sky-colored camouflage. The color is also widely used as the uniform of the Indonesian Air Force personnel who operate the aircraft. It was also chosen as a unique identity, since there are no Indonesian commercial aircraft using this color in their livery. In early August 2021, the presidential aircraft was repainted red on top and white on the bottom.

The chartered Boeing 777-300ER is painted white with a red cheatline over the length of the fuselage and up the tail, with "Republik Indonesia" written on the front of the fuselage between the National Emblem and the Flag of Indonesia, and with "garuda" written on the tail in red.  This livery is similar to Garuda Indonesia's retro livery.

Fleet
The Presidential Flight fleet consists of the following aircraft (as of November, 2021):

Previously, the Indonesian Government operated Lockheed C-140 Jetstar, Ilyushin Il-18, Convair 990, Mcdonnell Douglas DC-8, Mcdonnell Douglas DC-10, Mcdonnell Douglas MD-11, Boeing 707-300, Boeing 737 Classic, Airbus A300, and A330-300 Aircraft chartered from Garuda Indonesia.

See also

 Presidential state car
 Air Force One

Notes

References

Presidential aircraft
Indonesian Air Force
Call signs
Boeing 737
Presidents of Indonesia
Individual aircraft